Phthalates, or phthalate esters, are esters of phthalic acid. They are mainly used as plasticizers, i.e., substances added to plastics to increase their flexibility, transparency, durability, and longevity. They are used primarily to soften polyvinyl chloride (PVC).  Note that while phthalates are usually plasticizers, not all plasticizers are phthalates.  The two terms are specific and unique and cannot be used interchangeably.

Lower-molecular-weight phthalates, those derived from C3-C6 alcohols, are being gradually replaced in many products in the United States, Canada, and European Union over health concerns. They are being replaced by high-molecular-weight phthalates (those with more than six carbons in their backbone, which gives them increased permanency and durability), as well as alternative plasticizers not based on phthalic anhydride. In 2010, the market was still dominated by high-phthalate plasticizers; however, due to legal provisions and growing environmental awareness and perceptions, producers are increasingly switching to non-phthalate plasticizers. The legacy use of phthalate plasticizers has prevented manufacturers from using post-consumer recycled PVC since that recycled content would likely contain phthalates. Thus, many manufacturers have moved to use only virgin PVC in their products.  There are, however, efforts underway to collect post-consumer PVC for chemical recycling efforts that can remove legacy phthalates and create virgin-like PVC.  Those efforts are focused on areas like healthcare where PVC makes up a significant amount of medical devices.

Prevalence and human exposure
Due to the ubiquity of plasticized plastics, the majority of people are exposed to some level of phthalates. For example, most Americans tested by the Centers for Disease Control and Prevention have metabolites of multiple phthalates in their urine. In studies of rodents exposed to certain phthalates, high doses have been shown to change hormone levels and cause birth defects.

Production
Phthalates are produced industrially by the acid catalysed reaction of phthalic anhydride with excess alcohol. The synthesis of diethyl phthalate is illustrative of this:

The properties of the phthalate can be varied by changing the alcohol, allowing for an almost limitless range of products, although only around 30 are, or have been, commercially important. Phthalates' share of the global plasticisers market has been decreasing since around 2000. Despite this the global production of phthalates has continued to rise. In 2015 total production of was around 5.5 million tonnes, up from around 2.7 million tonnes in the 1980s. The reason for this has been the increasing size of the plasticiser market (a smaller slice of a much bigger pie), driven by increases in PVC production, which doubled between 2000 and 2020. The People's Republic of China is the largest consumer, accounting for around 45% of all use. Europe and the United States together account for around 25% of use, with the remainder widely spread around the world.

Natural occurrence
Various plants and microorganisms have been reported to naturally produce phthalate esters (endogenous phthalates). Biosynthesis is believed to involve a modified Shikimate pathway The extent of this natural production is not fully known, but it may create a background of phthalate pollution.

Uses

PVC Plasticisers

Between 90 and 95% of all phthalates are used as plasticisers for the production of flexible PVC. They were the first commercially important compounds for this role, a historic advantage that has led to them becoming firmly embedded in flexible PVC technology. Among the common plastics, PVC is unique in its acceptance of large amounts of plasticizer with gradual changes in physical properties from a rigid solid to a soft gel. Plasticizers, especially phthalates, derived from alcohols with 7-13 carbon atoms occupy a privileged position as general purpose plasticizers, suitable for almost all flexible PVC applications. Phthalates larger than this have limited compatibility in PVC, with di(isotridecyl) phthalate representing the practical upper limit. Conversely, plasticizers derived from alcohols with 4-6 carbon atoms are too volatile to be used on their own, but have been used alongside other compounds as secondary plasticizers, where they improve low-temperature flexibility. Compounds derived from alcohols with 1-3 carbon atoms are not used as plasticizers in PVC at all, due excessive fuming at processing temperatures (typically 180-210°C).

Historically DINP, DEHP, DIOP, DBP, and DIHP have been the most important phthalates, however many of these are now facing regulatory pressure and gradual phase-outs. Almost all phthalates derived from alcohols with 8 or fewer carbons are classed as toxic by ECHA. This includes Bis(2-ethylhexyl) phthalate (DEHP or DOP), which has long been the most widely used phthalate, with commercial production dating back to the 1930s. In the EU, the use of DEHP is restricted under REACH and it can only be used in specific cases if an authorisation has been granted; similar restrictions exist in many other jurisdictions. Despite this, the phase-out of DEHP is slow and it was still the most frequently used plasticizer in 2018, with an estimated global production of 3.24 million tonnes. DINP and DIDP are used as a substitutes for DEHP in many applications, as they are not classified as hazardous. Non-phthalate plasticizers are also being increasingly used.

Almost 90% of all plasticizers are used in PVC, giving this material improved flexibility and durability. The majority is used in films and cable sheathing. Flexible PVC can consist of over 85% plasticizer by mass, however unplasticized PVC (UPVC) should not contain any.

Non-PVC Plasticisers
Phthalates see use as plasticisers in various other polymers, with applications centred around coatings such as lacquers, varnishes, and paints. The addition of phthalates imparts some flexibility to these materials, reducing their tendency to chip. 
Phthalates derived from alcohols with between 1-4 carbon atoms are used as plasticisers for cellulose-type plastics, such as cellulose acetate, nitrocellulose and cellulose acetate butyrate, with commonly encountered applications including nail polish. Most phthalates are also compatible with alkyds and acrylic resins, which are used in both oil and emulsion based paints.

Other plasticised polymer systems include polyvinyl butyral (particularly the forms used to make laminated glass), PVA and its co-polymers like PVCA. They are also compatible in nylon, polystyrene, polyurethanes, and certain rubbers; but their use in these is very limited. Phthalates have also been used for producing plastic explosives such as Semtex.

Phthalates can plasticise ethyl cellulose, polyvinyl acetate phthalate (PVAP) and cellulose acetate phthalate (CAP), all of which are used to make enteric coatings for tablet and capsule medications. These coatings protect drugs from the acidity of the stomach, but allow their release and absorption in the intestines.

Solvent and phlegmatizer
Phthalate esters are widely used as solvents for highly reactive organic peroxides.  Thousands of tonnes are consumed annually for this purpose.  The great advantage offered by these esters is that they are phlegmatizers, i.e. they minimize the explosive tendencies of a family of chemical compounds that otherwise are potentially dangerous to handle.

Other uses
Relatively minor amounts of some phthalates find use in personal-care items such as eye shadow, moisturizer, nail polish, liquid soap, and hair spray. Low-molecular-weight phthalates like dimethyl phthalate and diethyl phthalate are used as fixatives for perfumes. Dimethyl phthalate has been also used as an insect repellent and is especially useful against ixodid ticks responsible for Lyme disease. and species of mosquitoes such as Anopheles stephensi, Culex pipiens and Aedes aegypti,

Diallyl phthalate is used to prepare vinyl ester resins with excellent electrical insulation properties, these are used to manufacture of electronics components. Alkyds are sometimes classes as phthalates, as they meet the technical definition, however, being polymeric esters of phthalic acid their properties and applications are very different.

History
The development of cellulose nitrate plastic in 1846 led to the patent of castor oil in 1856 for use as the first plasticizer. In 1870, camphor became the more favored plasticizer for cellulose nitrate. Phthalates were first introduced in the 1920s and quickly replaced the volatile and odorous camphor. In 1931, the commercial availability of polyvinyl chloride (PVC) and the development of di(2-ethylhexyl) phthalate (DEHP) began the boom of the plasticizer PVC industry.

In February 2009, the Joint Research Centre (JRC) of the European Commission published a review of methods to measure phthalates in food.

In 2021, a study looked for phthalates in 64 fast food items. Phthalate DnBP was detected in 81 percent of the samples, while DEHP was found in 70 percent. Diethylhexyl terephthalate (DEHT), the main alternative to DEHP, was detected in 86%.

Properties
Phthalate esters are the dialkyl or alkyl aryl esters of phthalic acid (also called 1,2-benzenedicarboxylic acid, not be confused with the structurally isomeric terephthalic or isophthalic acids); the name "phthalate" derives from phthalic acid, which itself is derived from the word "naphthalene". When added to plastics, phthalates allow the long polyvinyl molecules to slide against one another. The phthalates have a clear syrupy liquid consistency and show low water solubility, high oil solubility, and low volatility. The polar carboxyl group contributes little to the physical properties of the phthalates, except when R and R' are very small (such as ethyl or methyl groups). Phthalates are colorless, odorless liquids produced by reacting phthalic anhydride with an appropriate alcohol (usually 6- to 13-carbon).

The mechanism by which phthalates and related compounds effect plasticization to polar polymers has been a subject of intense study since the 1960s. The mechanism is one of polar interactions between the polar centres of the phthalate molecule (the C=O functionality) and the positively charged areas of the vinyl chain, typically residing on the carbon atom of the carbon-chlorine bond. For this to be established, the polymer must be heated in the presence of the plasticizer, first above the Tg of the polymer and then into a melt state. This enables an intimate mix of polymer and plasticizer to be formed, and for these interactions to occur. When cooled, these interactions remain and the network of PVC chains cannot reform (as is present in unplasticized PVC, or PVC-U). The alkyl chains of the phthalate then screen the PVC chains from each other as well. They are blended within the plastic article as a result of the manufacturing process.

Because they are not chemically bonded to the host plastics, phthalates are released from the plastic article by relatively gentle means. For example, they can be removed by heating or by extraction with organic solvents.

Alternatives

Being inexpensive, nontoxic (in an acute sense), colorless, noncorrosive, biodegradable, and with easily tuned physical properties, phthalate esters are nearly ideal plasticizers. Among the numerous alternative plasticizers are dioctyl terephthalate (DEHT) (a terephthalate isomeric with DEHP) and 1,2-cyclohexane dicarboxylic acid diisononyl ester (DINCH) (a hydrogenated version of DINP). Both DEHT and DINCH have been used in high volumes for a variety of products used in contact with humans as alternative plasticizers for DEHP and DINP. Some of these products include medical devices, toys, and food packaging. DEHT and DINCH are more hydrophobic than other phthalate alternatives such as bis(2-ethylhexyl) adipate (DEHA) and diisodecyl adipate (DIDA). Since alternative plasticizers such as DEHT and DINCH are more likely to bind to organic matter and airborne particles indoors, exposure occurs primarily through food consumption and contact with dust.

Many bio-based plasticizers based on vegetable oil have been developed. They can be substituted for DEHP.

Environmental impact
Phthalates are easily released into the environment. In general, they do not persist due to rapid biodegradation, photodegradation, and anaerobic degradation. Outdoor air concentrations are higher in urban and suburban areas than in rural and remote areas.  They also pose no acute toxicity.

Because of their volatility, DEP and DMP are present in higher concentrations in air in comparison with the heavier and less volatile DEHP. Higher air temperatures result in higher concentrations of phthalates in the air. PVC flooring leads to higher concentrations of BBP and DEHP, which are more prevalent in dust. A 2012 Swedish study of children found that phthalates from PVC flooring were taken up into their bodies, showing that children can ingest phthalates not only from food but also by breathing and through the skin.

Diet is believed to be the main source of DEHP and other phthalates in the general population. Fatty foods such as milk, butter, and meats are a major source. Studies show that exposure to phthalates is greater from ingestion of certain foods, rather than exposure via water bottles as is most often first thought of with plastic chemicals. Low-molecular-weight phthalates such as DEP, DBP, BBzP may be dermally absorbed. Inhalational exposure is also significant with the more volatile phthalates.

Another study, conducted between 2003 and 2010 analysing data from 9,000 individuals, found that those who reported that they had eaten at a fast food restaurant had much higher levels of two separate phthalates—DEHP and DiNP—in their urine samples. Even small consumption of fast food caused higher presence of phthalates. "People who reported eating only a little fast food had DEHP levels that were 15.5 percent higher and DiNP levels that were 25 percent higher than those who said they had eaten none. For people who reported eating a sizable amount, the increase was 24 percent and 39 percent, respectively."

In a 2008 Bulgarian study, higher dust concentrations of DEHP were found in homes of children with asthma and allergies, compared with healthy children's homes. The author of the study stated, "The concentration of DEHP was found to be significantly associated with wheezing in the last 12 months as reported by the parents." Phthalates were found in almost every sampled home in Bulgaria. The same study found that DEHP, BBzP, and DnOP were in significantly higher concentrations in dust samples collected in homes where polishing agents were used. Data on flooring materials was collected, but there was not a significant difference in concentrations between homes where no polish was used that have balatum (PVC or linoleum) flooring and homes with wood. High frequency of dusting did decrease the concentration.

In general, children's exposure to phthalates is greater than that of adults. In a 1990s Canadian study that modeled ambient exposures, it was estimated that daily exposure to DEHP was 9 μg/kg bodyweight/day in infants, 19 μg/kg bodyweight/day in toddlers, 14 μg/kg bodyweight/day in children, and 6 μg/kg bodyweight/day in adults. Infants and toddlers are at the greatest risk of exposure, because of their mouthing behavior. Body-care products containing phthalates are a source of exposure for infants. The authors of a 2008 study "observed that reported use of infant lotion, infant powder, and infant shampoo were associated with increased infant urine concentrations of [phthalate metabolites], and this association is strongest in younger infants. These findings suggest that dermal exposures may contribute significantly to phthalate body burden in this population." Although they did not examine health outcomes, they noted that "Young infants are more vulnerable to the potential adverse effects of phthalates given their increased dosage per unit body surface area, metabolic capabilities, and developing endocrine and reproductive systems."

Infants and hospitalized children are particularly susceptible to phthalate exposure. Medical devices and tubing may contain 20–40% Di(2-ethylhexyl) phthalate (DEHP) by weight, which "easily leach out of tubing when heated (as with warm saline / blood)". Several medical devices contain phthalates including, but not limited to, IV tubing, gloves, nasogastric tubes, and respiratory tubing. The Food and Drug Administration did an extensive risk assessment of phthalates in the medical setting and found that neonates may be exposed to five times greater than the allowed daily tolerable intake. This finding led to the conclusion by the FDA that, "[c]hildren undergoing certain medical procedures may represent a population at increased risk for the effects of DEHP".

In 2008, the Danish Environmental Protection Agency (EPA) found a variety of phthalates in erasers and warned of health risks when children regularly suck and chew on them. The European Commission Scientific Committee on Health and Environmental Risks (SCHER), however, considers that, even in the case when children bite off pieces from erasers and swallow them, it is unlikely that this exposure leads to health consequences.

Phthalates are also found in medications, where they are used as inactive ingredients in producing enteric coatings. It is not known how many medications are made using phthalates, but some include omeprazole, didanosine, mesalamine, and theophylline. A recent study found that urinary concentrations of monobutyl phthalate, the DBP metabolite, of Asacol (a particular formulation of mesalamine) users was 50 times higher than the mean of nonusers. The study showed that exposures from phthalate-containing medications can far exceed population levels from other sources. DBP in medications raises concern about health risks due to the high level of exposures associated with taking these medications, especially in vulnerable segments of the population, including pregnant women and children.

In 2008, the United States National Research Council recommended that the cumulative effects of phthalates and other antiandrogens be investigated. It criticized U.S. EPA guidances, which stipulate that, when examining cumulative effects, the chemicals examined should have similar mechanisms of action or similar structures, as too restrictive. It recommended instead that the effects of chemicals that cause similar adverse outcomes should be examined cumulatively. Thus, the effect of phthalates should be examined together with other antiandrogens, which otherwise may have been excluded because their mechanisms or structure are different.

Health effects
A study in the peer-reviewed journal Environmental Pollution published October 12, 2021 found that high phthalate levels are weakly correlated with a greater risk of dying from any cause and with a stronger correlation to dying from heart problems, but the calculated hazard ratios were below 2 in both cases. The study estimated that phthalates may contribute to 91,000–107,000 premature deaths each year among people aged 55–64 in the United States.

Endocrine disruption

Phthalates enter the bloodstream and disrupt sex hormone production, interfering with sexual development in infants and sexual behaviour in adults. Levels of phthalates have been dose-dependently linked to reduced anogenital distance decreased sexual desire and satisfaction in women, and malformed genital development in rats.

Phthalates act by mimicking the female hormone estrogen, which in turn inhibits production of the male hormone testosterone. As such, phthalates are considered to be endocrine disruptors—a substance that interferes with the normal hormonal mechanisms that allow a biological organism to interact with its environment, and has sparked demands to ban or restrict its use in baby toys.

Endocrine disruptors exhibit numerous behaviors that can make studying them a challenge. There can be a lag between when someone is exposed to an endocrine disruptor and any symptoms manifesting themselves–in particular fetal and early childhood exposure may have consequences later in adulthood. Many studies refer to this period of fetal and postnatal development as particularly important to development, but studying this is difficult; it is obviously a huge challenge to measure endocrine disruptor exposure during fetal development and then decades later diagnosing any health problems. Additionally, endocrine disruptor exposure can transmit epigenetically to one's offspring without them being directly exposed to the endocrine disruptors. Finally, particularly low levels of exposure may still have significant effects, and exposure to multiple endocrine disruptors across a variety of compounds (not just phthalates) may synergistically combine to cause a greater effect. Evaluating the actual effects of a specific compound such as a particular phthalate requires examining cumulative exposure across multiple compounds, rather than evaluating one compound in isolation.

A widespread concern about phthalate exposure is the possibility (though not conclusive) that it is the cause of a worldwide drop in male fertility. Studies have shown that phthalates cause abnormalities in the reproductive systems of animals, with the greatest effects when the animal is exposed during gestation and immediately thereafter. Numerous studies on adult male humans show the similar result that phthalate exposure correlates with worsening metrics of male fertility, such as semen quality, the quantity of damaged DNA in sperm, decreased sperm motility, decreased semen volume, and other metrics. Phthalates causing harm to the male reproductive system is plausible, and continues to be researched.

The effect of phthalates on the female reproductive system is also not fully understood yet. Current studies indicate phthalates have negative effects on folliculogenesis and steroidogenesis.

Early research also shows phthalate exposure may be associated with diabetes and insulin resistance, breast cancer, obesity, metabolic disorders, and immune function.

There are possible (though not conclusive) associations between phthalate exposure and adverse child neurodevelopment, including the development of ADHD and autistic behaviors and lower cognitive and motor development. Most common associations found in medical reports link the phthalates exposure to hyperactivity, aggression, and other adverse behaviors. Some studies have found the childhood exposure to be as early as in utero.

In many cases, there are studies that show connections between phthalates and these negative outcomes, as well as studies that show no connection; this is likely due to the research challenges outlined above, and when resolved, could show that phthalate exposure does not cause health effects, or even that they have a much greater effect than currently predicted. In all cases, larger studies are needed to demonstrate incontrovertibly what effect phthalate exposure has on human health.

A Nature Reviews Endocrinology review paper from 2017 gives some advice for avoiding exposure to phthalates for concerned people; while they make pains to state that there is no evidence that shows this advice will positively affect one's health, they suggest (1) eating a balanced diet to avoid ingesting too many endocrine disruptors from a single source, (2) eliminating canned or packaged food in order to limit ingestion of DEHP phthalates leached from plastics, and (3) eliminating use of any personal product such as moisturizer, perfume, or cosmetics that contain phthalates. Eliminating personal products containing phthalates can be particularly difficult or impossible due to some countries such as the United States not requiring them to be disclosed in a list of ingredients.

Endocannabinoid system disruption 
Phthalates block CB1 as allosteric antagonists.

Other effects

There may be a link between the obesity epidemic and endocrine disruption and metabolic interference. Studies conducted on mice exposed to phthalates in utero did not result in metabolic disorder in adults. However, "in a national cross-section of U.S. men, concentrations of several prevalent phthalate metabolites showed statistically significant correlations with abnormal obesity and insulin resistance."  Mono-ethylhexyl-phthalate (MEHP), a metabolite of DEHP, has been found to interact with all three peroxisome proliferator-activated receptors (PPARs). PPARs are members of the nuclear receptor superfamily. The author of the study stated "The roles of PPARs in lipid and carbohydrate metabolism raise the question of their activation by a sub-class of pollutants, tentatively named metabolic disrupters." Phthalates belong to this class of metabolic disruptors. It is a possibility that, over many years of exposure to these metabolic disruptors, they are able to deregulate complex metabolic pathways in a subtle manner.

Large amounts of specific phthalates fed to rodents have been shown to damage their liver and testes, and initial rodent studies also indicated hepatocarcinogenicity. Following this result, di(2-ethylhexyl) phthalate was listed as a possible carcinogen by IARC, EC, and WHO. Later studies on primates showed that the mechanism is specific to rodents; humans are resistant to the effect. The carcinogen classification was subsequently withdrawn.

Legal status

Canada
In 1994, a Health Canada assessment found that DEHP and another phthalate product, B79P, were harmful to human health. The Canadian federal government responded by banning their use in cosmetics and restricting their use in other applications.

A more recent assessment in 2017 found that B79P and DEHP may cause environmental damage. As of 2019, regulations to protect the environment against DEHP and B79P have not yet been put into place.

European Union

The use of some phthalates has been restricted in the European Union for use in children's toys since 1999. DEHP, BBP, and DBP are restricted for all toys; DINP, DIDP, and DNOP are restricted only in toys that can be taken into the mouth. The restriction states that the amount of these phthalates may not be greater than 0.1% mass percent of the plasticized part of the toy.

Generally, the high molecular weight phthalates DINP, DIDP, and DPHP have been registered under REACH and have demonstrated their safety for use in current applications. They are not classified for any health or environmental effects.

The low molecular weight products BBP, DEHP, DIBP, and DBP were added to the Candidate list of Substances for Authorisation under REACH in 2008–9, and added to the Authorisation list, Annex XIV, in 2012. This means that from February 2015 they are not allowed to be produced in the EU unless authorisation has been granted for a specific use, however they may still be imported in consumer products. The creation of an Annex XV dossier, which could ban the import of products containing these chemicals, was being prepared jointly by the ECHA and Danish authorities, and expected to be submitted by April 2016.

In 2006 the Dutch office of Greenpeace UK sought to encourage the European Union to ban sex toys that contained phthalates.

United States
During August 2008, the United States Congress passed and President George W. Bush signed the Consumer Product Safety Improvement Act (CPSIA), which became public law 110–314. Section 108 of that law specified that as of February 10, 2009, "it shall be unlawful for any person to manufacture for sale, offer for sale, distribute in commerce, or import into the United States any children's toy or child care article that contains concentrations of more than 0.1 percent of" DEHP, DBP, or BBP and "it shall be unlawful for any person to manufacture for sale, offer for sale, distribute in commerce, or import into the United States any children's toy that can be placed in a child's mouth or child care article that contains concentrations of more than 0.1 percent of" DINP, DIDP, DnOP. Furthermore, the law requires the establishment of a permanent review board to determine the safety of other phthalates. Prior to this legislation, the Consumer Product Safety Commission had determined that voluntary withdrawals of DEHP and diisononyl phthalate (DINP) from teethers, pacifiers, and rattles had eliminated the risk to children, and advised against enacting a phthalate ban.

In another development in 1986, California voters approved an initiative to address their growing concerns about exposure to toxic chemicals. That initiative became the Safe Drinking Water and Toxic Enforcement Act of 1986, better known by its original name of Proposition 65. In December 2013 DINP was listed as a chemical "known to the State of California to cause cancer" This means that, starting December 2014, companies with ten or more employees manufacturing, distributing or selling the product(s) containing DINP are required to provide a clear and reasonable warning for that product. The California Office of Environmental Health Hazard Assessment, charged with maintaining the Proposition 65 list and enforcing its provisions, has implemented a "No Significant Risk Level" of 146 μg/day for DINP.

Identification in plastics

Phthalates are used in some, but not all, PVC formulations, and there are no specific labeling requirements for phthalates. PVC plastics are typically used for various containers and hard packaging, medical tubing and bags, and are labeled "Type 3". However, the presence of phthalates rather than other plasticizers is not marked on PVC items. Only unplasticized PVC (uPVC), which is mainly used as a hard construction material, has no plasticizers. If a more accurate test is needed, chemical analysis, for example by gas chromatography or liquid chromatography, can establish the presence of phthalates.

Polyethylene terephthalate (PET, PETE, Terylene, Dacron) is the main substance used to package bottled water and many sodas. Products containing PETE are labeled "Type 1" (with a "1" in the recycle triangle). Although the word "phthalate" appears in the name, PETE does not use phthalates as plasticizers. The terephthalate polymer PETE and the phthalate ester plasticizers are chemically different substances. Despite this, however, a number of studies have found phthalates such as DEHP in bottled water and soda. One hypothesis is that these may have been introduced during plastic recycling.

See also 
 Xenoestrogen
 Non-phthalate plasticizers such as
1,2-Cyclohexane dicarboxylic acid diisononyl ester,
Dioctyl terephthalate, and
Citrates
Antiandrogens in the environment

References

Further reading

External links 

 
Plasticizers
Suspected testicular toxicants
Suspected fetotoxicants
Suspected teratogens
Endocrine disruptors